Amel Bouderra (born 26 March 1989) is a French basketball player for Flammes Carolo Basket and the French national team, where she participated at the 2016 Summer Olympics.

References

External links 
 
 

1989 births
Living people
Sportspeople from Mulhouse
Guards (basketball)
French women's basketball players
Basketball players at the 2016 Summer Olympics
Olympic basketball players of France
France women's national basketball team players